California's 50th congressional district is a congressional district in the U.S. state of California, and encompasses parts of the Mid-Coast and northeastern parts of San Diego County. Scott Peters is currently the U.S. representative for California's 50th congressional district.

The district is currently in San Diego County. It includes coastal and central portions of the city of San Diego, including neighborhoods such as Carmel Valley, La Jolla, Point Loma and Downtown San Diego; the San Diego suburbs of Poway and Coronado; and the campuses of schools such as the University of California, San Diego (partial), Point Loma Nazarene University, the University of San Diego, and various colleges of the San Diego Community College District.  Much of this territory was in the 52nd district from 2013 to 2023.

From 2003 through 2013, California's 52nd consisted of many of San Diego's northern and eastern suburbs, including Santee, Lakeside, Poway, Ramona, La Mesa, Alpine, Winter Gardens, Borrego Springs, and Spring Valley. Due to redistricting after the 2010 United States Census, much of this area is now part of the 50th district.

Despite being indicted by a federal grand jury for misusing campaign funds, Duncan D. Hunter narrowly won re-election in this district in 2018. On December 3, 2019, he pleaded guilty to one count of conspiracy misuse of campaign funds, and it was expected he would resign before being sentenced on March 17, 2020. On January 7, 2020, he submitted letters of resignation to both Speaker of the House Nancy Pelosi and Governor of California Gavin Newsom indicating that his resignation would take effect at close of business on January 13. A day later, Newsom's office stated that there would be no special election to fill the seat, and so it remained vacant until being filled in January 2021, as a result of the regularly scheduled 2020 election. Ammar Campa-Najjar,  the Democratic nominee for the seat in 2018, and Republican Darrell Issa, who formerly represented California's 49th congressional district, competed in this election. Issa won the seat by 8 points.

Geography  
The 50th district is based in San Diego County. It includes suburban and outlying areas of the county, including Fallbrook, San Marcos, Valley Center, Ramona, Escondido, Santee, Lakeside, parts of El Cajon and mountain and desert areas stretching east to the Imperial County line. It extends slightly into southwestern Riverside County and covers much of the city of Temecula.

Competitiveness

In statewide races

Composition

As of the 2020 redistricting, California's 50th congressional district is located in Southern California. It encompasses most of the South Bay region of San Diego County.

San Diego County is split between this district, the 48th district, the 49th district, the 51st district, and 52nd district. The 50th and 48th are partitioned by Gopher Canyon Rd, Escondido Freeway, Mountain Meadow Rd, Hidden Meadows, Reidy Cyn, N Broadway, Cougar Pass Rd, Adagio Way, Calle Ricardo, Tatas Place, Rue Montreux, Jesmond Dene Rd, Ivy Dell Ln, N Centre City Parkway, Highway 15, Richland Rd, Vista Canal, Woodland Parkway, W El Norte Parkway, Bennett Ave, Elser Ln, Nordahl Rd, Calavo Dr, Deodar Rd, Highway 78, Barham Dr, 2315-2339 Meyers Ave, Hill Valley Dr, County Club Dr, Auto Park Way, Highway 56, N Centre City Parkway, W Valley Parkway, N Juniper St, Highway 78, N Hickory St, E Mission Ave, Martin Dr, E Lincoln Ave, N Ash St, E Grand Ave, Bear Valley Parkway, Old Guerjito Rd, San Pasqual Battlefield State Historic Park, San Pasqual Trails Openspace, San Dieguito River Park, Bandy Canyon Rd, Santa Maria Creek, Highland Valley Rd, West Ridge Trail, Palmer Dr/Summerfield Ln, Pomerado Rd, and Carmel Mountain Ranch Openspace.

The 50th and 49th are partitioned by Gopher Canyon Rd, Camino Cantera, Corre Camino, Tierra del Cielo, Elevado Rd, Vista Grande Dr, Warmlands Ave, Queens Way, Canciones del Cielo, Camino Loma Verde, Alessandro Trail, Friendly Dr, Edgehill Rd, Catalina Heights Way, Deeb Ct, Foothill Dr, Clarence Dr, Highway S14, Smilax Rd, Poinsetta Ave, W San Marcos Blvd, Diamond Trail Preserve, S Rancho Santa Rd, San Elijo Rd, Rancho Summitt Dr, Escondido Creek, El Camino del Norte, San Elijo Lagoon, Highland Dr, Avacado Pl, Jimmy Durante Blvd, San Dieguito Dr, 8th St, Nob Ave, Highway S21, and the San Diego Northern Railway.

The 50th and 51st are partitioned by Camino del Norte, Highway 15, Carmel Mountain Rd, Ted Williams Parkway, Del Mar Mesa Openspace, Los Penasquitos Creek, Inland Freeway, Governor Dr, Pavlov Ave, Stetson Ave, Millikin Ave, Regents Rd, Ducommun Ave, Bunch Ave, Branting St, Streseman St, Pennant Way, Highway 52, San Diego Freeway, Sea World Dr, Friars Rd, Kumeyaay Highway, and Highway 805.

The 50th and 52nd are partitioned by Iowa St, University Ave, Inland Freeway, Escondido Freeway, Martin Luther King Jr Freeway, John J Montgomery Freeway, and San Diego Bay.

The 50th district takes in the cities of Coronado, San Marcos, and southern Escondido, as well as the San Diego neighborhoods of San Pasqual, Rancho Bernardo, La Jolla, Point Loma, University City, Torrey Pines, Mission Beach, North Park, Hillcrest, South Park, Golden Hill, Pacific Beach, Carmel Valley, Pacific Highlands Ranch, and Black Mountain Ranch.

Cities & CDP with 10,000 or more people
 San Diego - 1,386,932
 Escondido - 151,038
 Rancho Bernardo - 133,481
 San Marcos - 94,833
 Coronado - 20,192

List of members representing the district

Elections results

1992

1994

1996

1998

2000

2002

2004

2006 (Special) 

Representative Cunningham resigned on November 28, 2005, as a result of a bribery scandal. An open special election was held on April 11, 2006. The top vote getter was Democrat Francine Busby, who won 44% of the vote. The second-place finisher was Republican Brian Bilbray, who won 15% of the vote. Paul King was the top Libertarian party vote getter, with 0.6% of the vote. Since no candidate received a simple majority, the top vote-getters in each party competed in a runoff or special general election on June 6, 2006 (the same day as the statewide California primary). Bilbray was sworn in on June 13, based on unofficial counts, two weeks before the election was certified. As a consequence of this action, a court challenge to the election results filed by voters was denied on jurisdictional grounds. This decision was appealed unsuccessfully.

2006

2008

2010

2012

2014

2016

2018

2020

2022

Historical district boundaries

44th district 
In the 1980s,  was one of four encompassing San Diego. The district had been held for eight years by Democrat Jim Bates and was considered the most Democratic district in the San Diego area. However, Bates became bogged down in a scandal involving charges of sexual harassment.

Randy "Duke" Cunningham won the Republican nomination and hammered Bates about the scandal. Cunningham won by a point. The San Diego area was represented entirely by Republicans for only the second time since the city was split into three districts after the 1960 United States census. After his victory, Cunningham changed his official residence from his Del Mar home to a condominium in the Mission Valley neighborhood in San Diego, so he could reside in the district that he represented in Congress.

41st district 
In the 1980s,  was another of four encompassing San Diego. The northern San Diego County district had been held for 12 years by Republican Bill Lowery and was considered the most Republican district in the San Diego area. Most of the district became the  after state redistricting following the 1990 United States census.

In 1992, Cunningham campaigned against Lowery in Lowery's district in the Republican primary. The new 51st district was more dominated by ethnic whites and was more conservative than Cunningham's more urban, former 41st district located farther south. Lowery was tainted by the House check kiting scandal and lost the primary to Cunningham. The latter, a Navy career officer, had run on a campaign theme of "A Congressman We Can Be Proud Of." After winning, Cunningham changed his official residence back to his Del Mar home in the old 41st/new 51st district.

2000s 

From 2003 to 2013, the 50th district consisted of the northern coastal region of San Diego County and included the suburbs of San Marcos, Carlsbad, Encinitas, Solana Beach, and Escondido.

In popular culture 

On November 29, 2005, Stephen Colbert of Comedy Central's The Colbert Report declared on his show that the 50th congressional district was "dead" to him after its insufficient support for his "friend" Duke Cunningham. Colbert placed the district on the show's ever-changing "Dead to Me" board, saying that he now considered the number of congressional districts in the United States to be 434. On March 1, 2006, he "downgraded" the 50th district's status from "dead to me" to "never existed to me."

See also 

 List of United States congressional districts
 United States congressional delegations from California

References

External links 

 sdvote.com: San Diego Voter Registrar
 sos.ca.gov: Secretary of State Padilla Announces Results of Randomized Alphabet Drawing for June 7 Presidential Primary Election Ballots
 GovTrack.us: California's 50th congressional district

50
Government of San Diego County, California
Political districts in Riverside County, California
East County (San Diego County)
North County (San Diego County)
Escondido, California
Ramona, San Diego County, California
San Marcos, California
Santee, California
Temecula, California
Valley Center, California
Constituencies established in 1993
1993 establishments in California